Pollo (sometimes stylized as POLLO) is a rap group formed in 2010 in São Paulo, Brazil by the MCs Luiz Tomim (also known as “Tomim”), Adriel de Menezes (also known as "AdR"), and DJ Kalfani. The band found fame with its hit “Vagalumes”, which has had over 30 million views on YouTube. In September 2013, after the disappearance of Adriel Luis Tomim, DJ Kalfani and Luiz Tomim announced they were fulfilling the touring schedule and commitments until 31 December 2013, when they would disband and stop performing. Three days later, after a decision by the remaining band members, Adriel stated that the band would not discontinue.

Biography

2011-2012: Vim Pra Dominar o Mundo
The group was originally formed in 2010, recording and writing entirely in a home production environment, and distributing their music via the Internet. The first song which was professionally studio recorded was "Trama", in 2010. Pollo became known on the Internet for the song "Zica do Bagui", from collaborator Bonde da Stronda. In 2012, they announced a new member, DJ Kalfani, son of KL Jay from Racionais MC’s.
In 2012, the group released the clips "Trama", "Pirituba City", "As Quatro", "Buxixos & Simpatias", and "Vagalumes".

According to Brasil Hot Airplay, the song "Vagalumes" was one of the most requested songs on radio. It was also included in the soundtrack of Rede Globo's telenovela Sangue Bom. With the participation of singer Ivo Mozart, the song was nominated in, and won, the categories of best song and music video of the year. The song currently has over 30 million views on YouTube. In the same year, the band released their first album titled "Vim Para Dominar o Mundo" which could be downloaded for free on iTunes.

2013–present
In 2014, the band released a new album, under the label Som Livre, called "777".

Discography

Albums

 Vim Pra Dominar o Mundo (2012)
 777 (2014)

Singles

 "Vagalumes" (featuring Ivo Mozart)
 "Zika do Bagui" (with Bonde da Stronda)
 "Piritubacity"
 "As Quatro"
 "Trama"
 "Buxixo & Simpatia"
 "Exceção da Regra"
 "Fiesta Muy Loka"
 "Vim Pra Dominar O Mundo"(feat Terra Preta)

Music videos

References

External links
 

Brazilian hip hop groups
Musical groups established in 2010
Musical groups from São Paulo
2010 establishments in Brazil